CF Montréal U23, formerly Montreal Impact U23, is a Canadian soccer team based in Montreal, Quebec, Canada that  plays in the Première ligue de soccer du Québec. They are the reserve club of Major League Soccer club CF Montréal and represent the highest team of the CF Montréal Academy. Previously known as Montreal Impact U23, in 2014, they played in the Premier Development League, the fourth tier. The team was replaced the following year with FC Montreal in the professional second-tier USL Pro. In 2020, it was announced that the U23 team would be re-started for the 2021 season.

History
From 2010 to 2012, the Montreal Impact Academy fielded their U21 team in the Canadian Soccer League, which was recognized as a tier 3 league in the Canadian soccer league system. However, the team withdrew from the league prior to the 2013 season, as the Canadian Soccer Association de-sanctioned the league following a match-fixing scandal.

In 2014, the club decided to re-brand the team as a U23 team and entered the team into the Premier Development League, in the fourth tier of the United States soccer league system. They played their first match on 17 May against the Westchester Flames, which they won by a score of 4–0. They finished the season in fourth place in the Northeast Division.

In 2015, the Impact decided to form a reserve professional team in the second tier USL Pro called FC Montreal. As a result, the PDL team was disbanded with most of the players moving to the new pro reserve team.

The club announced that they would reform a U23 team for the 2021 season. with Patrice Bernier serving as post-formation supervisor, where he will work primarily with the first team players in the U23 team. Throughout the 2021 season, the U23s played friendlies against the teams in the Première ligue de soccer du Québec. They joined the PLSQ as formal members in 2022.

Players

Current squad

Record
Year by year

Notable former players
The following players have either played at the professional or international level, either before or after playing for the CF Montreal U23 team:

References 

Montreal U23
CF Montréal
Association football clubs established in 2014
2014 establishments in Quebec
Canadian reserve soccer teams
Defunct Premier Development League teams